Joachim Spremberg (3 November 1908 – 16 July 1975) was a German rower who competed in the 1932 Summer Olympics in Los Angeles. He won the gold medal as member of the German boat in the coxed fours competition. He was born in Berlin.

References

External links
 Joachim Spremberg's profile at databaseOlympics.com
 Joachim Spremberg's profile at Sports Reference.com

1908 births
1975 deaths
Rowers from Berlin
Olympic rowers of Germany
Rowers at the 1932 Summer Olympics
Olympic gold medalists for Germany
Olympic medalists in rowing
German male rowers
Medalists at the 1932 Summer Olympics
20th-century German people